Elvira Betrone (1881–1961) was an Italian actress of stage, film, radio and television.

Selected filmography
 Teresa Venerdì (1941)
 A Garibaldian in the Convent (1942)
 A Pilot Returns (1942)
 Disturbance (1942)
 Jealousy (1942)
 The Ten Commandments (1945)
 Il Brigante Musolino (1950)
 The Ungrateful Heart (1951)

References

Bibliography
 Bert Cardullo. Vittorio De Sica: Director, Actor, Screenwriter. McFarland, 2002.

External links

1881 births
1961 deaths
Italian stage actresses
Italian film actresses
Actresses from Rome